Monommata is a genus of rotifers belonging to the family Notommatidae.

The species of this genus are found in Europe, Australia and Northern America.

Species:
 Monommata actices Myers, 1930 
 Monommata aequalis (Ehrenberg, 1830)

References

Ploima
Rotifer genera